The 1977 Skate Canada International was held in Moncton, New Brunswick on October 27–29. Medals were awarded in the disciplines of men's singles, ladies' singles, and ice dancing.

Results

Men

Ladies

Ice dancing

References

Skate Canada International, 1977
Skate Canada International
1977 in Canadian sports 
1977 in New Brunswick